Michel Macedo may refer to:

 Michel Macedo (footballer) (born 1990), Brazilian footballer
 Michel Macedo (skier) (born 1998), Brazilian alpine skier